Ekklesia is the debut album released by the American Christian metalcore band For Today. The album was released on April 1, 2008 through Facedown Records. A version of the album featuring their old lead singer has found its way onto the internet through the means of a blogspot page. The album includes 10 tracks with a range in different sounds from the metal genre as well as an instrumental track and intro. According to the liner notes, Matt Tyler, the band's former vocalist, is featured on "Redemption" and "A Higher Standard".

Track listing

Personnel 
For Today
 Mattie Montgomery – lead vocals
 Ryan Leitru - lead guitar
 Mike Reynolds - rhythm guitar
 Brandon Leitru - bass guitar
 David Morrison - drums, percussion
source

Additional musicians Matt Tyler - guest vocals on "Redemption" and "A Higher Standard"Production'
Produced, Engineered, Mixed, and mastered by Jamie King
 Artwork by Dave Quiggle

References 

2008 debut albums
For Today albums
Facedown Records albums